Eupithecia nigrilinea is a moth in the  family Geometridae. It is found in Afghanistan, Uzbekistan, Kyrgyzstan, Tajikistan, Pakistan, Jammu and Kashmir, Nepal and northern Thailand. The habitat consists of mountainous areas at altitudes ranging from 1,700 to 4,500 meters.

There is one generation per year with adults on wing in summer.

References

Moths described in 1896
nigrilinea
Moths of Asia